The third and final season of the American superhero television series Batwoman was announced in February 2021 and premiered on The CW on October 13, 2021. It stars Javicia Leslie, Rachel Skarsten, Meagan Tandy, Nicole Kang, Camrus Johnson, Robin Givens, Victoria Cartagena, and Nick Creegan.

Episodes

Cast and characters

Main
 Javicia Leslie as Ryan Wilder / Batwoman
 Rachel Skarsten as Beth Kane / Alice
 Meagan Tandy as Sophie Moore
 Nicole Kang as Mary Hamilton / Poison Mary
 Camrus Johnson as Luke Fox / Batwing
 Victoria Cartagena as Renee Montoya
 Robin Givens as Jada Jet
 Nick Creegan as Marquis Jet

Recurring
 Rachel Maddow as the voice of Vesper Fairchild
 Allison Riley as Dana DeWitt
 Donny Lucas as the voice of Lucius Fox A.I.

Guest
 Amitai Marmorstein as Liam Crandle / Mad Hatter II
 Sharon Taylor as Mayor Hartley
 Heidi Ben as Steven / Killer Croc 2.0
 Alistair Abell as Mason
 Nevis Unipan as Whitney Hutchison
 Jennifer Cheon Garcia as Head Mercenary
 June B. Wilde as Dee Smithy
 Jennifer Higgin as Nora Fries
 Bridget Regan as Pamela Isley / Poison Ivy
 Keeya King as Jordan Moore
 Tom Lenk as Charlie Clark
 Josh Blacker as Virgil Getty
 Rob Nagle as Lazlo Valentin / Professor Pyg
 David Ramsey as John Diggle
 Alex Morf as Victor Zsasz
 Judy Reyes as Kiki Roulette
 Sam Littlefield as Jonathan Cartwright / Mouse
 Nathan Owens as Ocean
 Nathan Dashwood as Jack Napier / Joker
 Sara J. Southey as Barbara Kean
 Eric Ruggieri as Burton Crowne
 Glen Ferguson as Jeremiah Arkham
 Marcio Barauna as Mario Falcone

Production

Development
On February 3, 2021, it was announced that The CW had renewed 12 original series for additional seasons through the 2021–2022 television seasons. One of those series was revealed to be Batwoman, along with other Arrowverse series The Flash and Legends of Tomorrow.

Casting
Javicia Leslie reprises her role as Ryan Wilder / Batwoman, having replaced Ruby Rose in the second season after the latter left the show. Rachel Skarsten, Meagan Tandy, Nicole Kang and Camrus Johnson also return as Beth Kane / Alice, Sophie Moore, Mary Hamilton and Luke Fox / Batwing respectively; however, Dougray Scott did not return as Jacob Kane. In July 2021, Robin Givens, Victoria Cartagena, and Nick Creegan were cast as new series regulars for the third season, as Jada Jet, Renee Montoya, and Marquis Jet, respectively; Cartagena had previously played Montoya on Fox's Gotham. In August 2021, Bridget Regan was cast in the recurring role of Pamela Isley / Poison Ivy.

Filming
Filming began production on July 19, 2021, and concluded on December 22.

Broadcast
The season premiered on The CW on October 13, 2021. The season finale aired on March 2, 2022.

Reception

References

External links
 

Batwoman (TV series) seasons
2021 American television seasons
2022 American television seasons